Ophidiiformes  is an order of ray-finned fish that includes the cusk-eels (family Ophidiidae), pearlfishes (family Carapidae), viviparous brotulas (family Bythitidae), and others. Members of this order have small heads and long slender bodies. They have either smooth scales or no scales, a long dorsal fin and an anal fin that typically runs into the caudal fin. They mostly come from the tropics and subtropics, and live in both freshwater and marine habitats, including abyssal depths. They have adopted a range of feeding methods and lifestyles, including parasitism. The majority are egg-laying, but some are viviparous.

Distribution
Many other species, however, live in shallow water, especially near coral reefs, while a few inhabit freshwater. Most species live in tropical or subtropical habitats, but some species are known from as far north as the coast of Greenland, and as far south as the Weddell Sea.

Characteristics
Ophidiiform fish typically have slender bodies with small heads, and either smooth scales, or none at all. They have long dorsal fins, and an anal fin that is typically united with the caudal fin. The group includes pelagic, benthic, and even parasitic species, although all have a similar body form. Some species are viviparous, giving birth to live young, rather than laying eggs.

The families Ranicipitidae (tadpole cods) and Euclichthyidae (eucla cods) were formerly classified in this order, but are now preferred in Gadiformes; Ranicipitidae has been absorbed within the family Gadidae.

Timeline of genera

Classification
The order Ophidiiformes is subdivided into suborders and families as follows:

 Suborder Ophidioidei 
 Family Carapidae Poey, 1867 — pearlfishes
 Family Ophidiidae Rafinesque, 1810— cusk-eels
Suborder Bythitoidei
 Family Bythitidae Gill, 1861 — viviparous brotulas
 Family Aphyonidae Jordan & Evermann, 1898 — aphyonids, blind cusk-eel
 Family Parabrotulidae Nielsen, 1968 — false brotulas

The suborder Ophidioidei may be a paraphyletic grouping but the suborder Bythitoidei are viviparous and seem to make up a monophyletic clade, while the Ophidioidei are oviparous.

References 

 
 
 

 
Ray-finned fish orders
Taxa named by Lev Berg